Norma Enriqueta "Queta" Basilio Sotelo (15 July 1948 – 26 October 2019) was a Mexican track and field athlete. She was born in Mexicali, capital of Baja California. She came from an athletic family; her father was a cotton farmer. Her Polish coach, Vladimir Puzio, moved her from high jumping to hurdling. She made history by becoming the first woman to light the Olympic Cauldron. She was the last torch-bearer of the 19th Summer Olympics in Mexico City on 12 October 1968.

She was a national athletics champion and record-holder in 80 metres hurdles and finished seventh in this event at the 1967 Pan American Games. At the 1968 Olympics she was eliminated in the heats of the 400 metres, 80 metres hurdles and 4 × 100 metres relay events. In 1970, she took bronze in the Central American Games 4 x 100m relay.

She married the basketball player Mario Álvarez, who was later secretary to the Oaxaca state governor. She was widowed with three young children when he died in an aeroplane accident. She studied sociology at the National Autonomous University of Mexico and became a federal deputy for the Institutional Revolutionary Party (PRI) during the LVIII Legislature of the Mexican Congress.

She became a permanent member of the Mexico Olympic Committee and was part of the 2004 Olympic torch relay when it was passing through Mexico City. In 2014, she was amongst 6,500 people defrauded of their savings in a money-lending business scam. She died of pneumonia on 26 October 2019, aged 71.

On 15 October 2020, the small moon of trojan asteroid 3548 Eurybates was named Queta after her, making her the first Olympic athlete honored in this way.

References

External links
The Mexican Legislative Branch Official Website
Sánchez Hidalgo, "Nuestros Juegos México 68", Published by "Comité Olímpico Mexicano" (Mexican Olympic Committee). 2003
Mexican Olympic Committee "Memoria México 68"
Mention in Time magazine article '68 Olympics:

1948 births
2019 deaths
Sportspeople from Mexicali
Mexican female sprinters
Mexican female hurdlers
Olympic athletes of Mexico
Athletes (track and field) at the 1968 Summer Olympics
Pan American Games competitors for Mexico
Athletes (track and field) at the 1967 Pan American Games
Competitors at the 1970 Central American and Caribbean Games
Central American and Caribbean Games bronze medalists for Mexico
Olympic cauldron lighters
21st-century Mexican politicians
21st-century Mexican women politicians
Politicians from Baja California
Institutional Revolutionary Party politicians
Members of the Chamber of Deputies (Mexico)
Women members of the Chamber of Deputies (Mexico)
Central American and Caribbean Games medalists in athletics
Deputies of the LVIII Legislature of Mexico